Bridgwater Canal may refer to:

Bridgwater and Taunton Canal in Somerset, England
Bridgewater Canal connecting Manchester and Runcorn in north west England

See also

Bridgwater Canalside Centre a community venue in Bridgwater, Somerset